Hyun-soo Kim (born January 12, 1988) is a South Korean professional baseball outfielder for the LG Twins of the KBO League. He previously played for the Doosan Bears, and has also played in Major League Baseball (MLB) for the Baltimore Orioles and Philadelphia Phillies.

Amateur career 
Kim attended Shinil High School in Seoul, South Korea. In September 2005, he competed for the South Korea national junior team, that was runner-up at the 6th Asian Junior Baseball Championship in Seoul, South Korea. At the championship, he went 1-for-4 as a backup outfielder in the South Korean roster.

In November 2005, Kim won the Lee Yeong-min Award, given annually to the most outstanding high school hitter in South Korea.

Professional career

Doosan Bears
Upon graduation from high school, Kim made himself eligible for the 2006 KBO First-Year Player Draft, but went undrafted. Instead, he was signed by the Doosan Bears as an undrafted free agent. He spent the whole 2006 season playing for the reserve team of the Bears.

In the 2007 season, Kim took over the starting job after starting outfielder Yoo Jae-woong was sidelined with a sprained ankle in the beginning of the season. Kim hit .273 with 5 home runs and 32 runs batted in in 99 games, and finished runner-up for Rookie of the Year.

In the 2008 KBO season, Kim won the batting title with an average of .357 and was first in hits with 168. He finished runner-up in MVP voting and won the Golden Glove Award as an outfielder.

In the 2009 KBO season, Kim exploded offensively, batting .357 and smacking 23 home runs. He defended his hit title with 172, and was runner-up in RBI (104) and triples (6), third in batting average, runs (97), doubles (31), on-base percentage (.448) and slugging percentage (.589), and eleventh in home runs.

On December 11, 2009, he won the KBO Golden Glove Award for outfielder for two consecutive years.

Baltimore Orioles
On December 23, 2015, Kim signed a two-year, $7 million contract with the Baltimore Orioles.

After struggling in spring training, Kim ultimately made the team after refusing a minor league assignment which led to him being booed on Opening Day. On April 10, 2016, Kim played his first career MLB game versus the Tampa Bay Rays. In that game he had two hits and scored a run. Kim finished his first month of Major League baseball having played in only six games, but making an impact, going 9-for-15 (.600), driving in one run, scoring two runs, and having an on-base percentage of .647. He hit his First Major League Career home run on May 29, against the Cleveland Indians that broke a 4–4 tie in the 7th inning.

On June 30, Kim hit the Orioles' 56th home run in the month of June, setting a new Major League record for the month.

On September 25, Kim hit a 2-run home run in the second inning of a game against the Arizona Diamondbacks. The O's would win the game 2–1, proving his homer to be the game winner. Three days later, on September 28, Kim hit a 2-run home run in the ninth inning of a game against the Toronto Blue Jays. The Orioles were facing a 2–1 deficit at the time and Kim hit the go ahead, game-winning home run on the ninth pitch of his at-bat. The Orioles would go on to win the game 3–2.  Kim ended his 2016 season with a .302 batting average.

Philadelphia Phillies
On July 28, 2017, the Orioles traded Kim and Garrett Cleavinger to the Philadelphia Phillies for Jeremy Hellickson.

LG Twins
On December 19, 2017, Kim signed a four-year, $10.7 million contract with the LG Twins. On December 17, 2021, Kim re-signed with the Twins on a six-year, $9.7 million contract.

International career

In August 2008, Kim competed for the South Korea national baseball team in the 2008 Olympic Games, where they won the gold medal in the baseball tournament. In the preliminary round game against Japan, Kim hit a go-ahead RBI single in the top of the ninth off closer Iwase Hitoki to break a 2–2 tie as a pinch hitter, leading South Korea to a 5–3 win over Japan.

In March 2009, Kim competed for the South Korea national baseball team in the 2009 World Baseball Classic, where they finished runner-up with a 6–3 record. In the tournament, he went 11-for-28 (.393) with 4 RBIs, 6 runs and 7 walks, and was named to the All-Star team at designated hitter. He played for Korea again in the 2013 World Baseball Classic, going 3 for 12 in Korea's three games.

Kim did not play for South Korea national baseball team in the 2017 World Baseball Classic, instead wanting to focus on getting ready for the 2017 MLB season with the Baltimore Orioles.

In 2018, he represented South Korea at the 2018 Asian Games, helping Korea to win Gold.

Awards and honors
KBO
2008 KBO Golden Glove Award (Outfielder)
2009 KBO Golden Glove Award (Outfielder)
2010 KBO Golden Glove Award (Outfielder)
2015 KBO Golden Glove Award (Outfielder)

Achievements
KBO
2008 Batting Title
2008 On-base Percentage Title
2008 Hit Title
2009 Hit Title

References

External links 

Career statistics and player information from Korea Baseball Organization

1988 births
Living people
Asian Games gold medalists for South Korea
Asian Games medalists in baseball
Baltimore Orioles players
Baseball players at the 2008 Summer Olympics
Baseball players at the 2020 Summer Olympics
Baseball players at the 2010 Asian Games
Baseball players at the 2014 Asian Games
Baseball players at the 2018 Asian Games
Baseball players from Seoul
Doosan Bears players
KBO League outfielders
Major League Baseball left fielders
Major League Baseball players from South Korea
Major League Baseball right fielders
Medalists at the 2008 Summer Olympics
Medalists at the 2010 Asian Games
Medalists at the 2014 Asian Games
Medalists at the 2018 Asian Games
Olympic baseball players of South Korea
Olympic gold medalists for South Korea
Olympic medalists in baseball
Philadelphia Phillies players
South Korean expatriate baseball players in the United States
2015 WBSC Premier12 players
2009 World Baseball Classic players
2013 World Baseball Classic players
2023 World Baseball Classic players